Nicole Forrester (born 17 November 1976) is a Canadian high jumper.  She was born in Aurora, Ontario. Her personal best jump is 1.97 metres, achieved in July 2007 in Thessaloniki.

Education and career
Forrester completed her Bachelor of Arts in Management and Communication and her Bachelor of Science in Movement Science at the University of Michigan. She completed her Masters of Education in Exercise and Sport Psychology from the University of Texas. She completed her PhD in Sports Psychology at Michigan State University with a dissertation titled "Good to great in elite athletes: towards an understanding of why some athletes make the leap and others do not."  Forrester is an Assistant Professor in the RTA School of Media at Toronto Metropolitan University in Toronto, Ontario.

Competition record

References

External links
 
 
 
 
 
 
 

1976 births
Living people
Sportspeople from Aurora, Ontario
Track and field athletes from Ontario
Canadian female high jumpers
Olympic track and field athletes of Canada
Athletes (track and field) at the 2008 Summer Olympics
Pan American Games medalists in athletics (track and field)
Athletes (track and field) at the 1999 Pan American Games
Athletes (track and field) at the 2003 Pan American Games
Athletes (track and field) at the 2007 Pan American Games
Commonwealth Games medallists in athletics
Commonwealth Games gold medallists for Canada
Athletes (track and field) at the 1998 Commonwealth Games
Athletes (track and field) at the 2002 Commonwealth Games
Athletes (track and field) at the 2006 Commonwealth Games
Athletes (track and field) at the 2010 Commonwealth Games
World Athletics Championships athletes for Canada
Pan American Games silver medalists for Canada
Pan American Games bronze medalists for Canada
Universiade medalists in athletics (track and field)
Universiade silver medalists for Canada
Black Canadian female track and field athletes
Medalists at the 2001 Summer Universiade
Medalists at the 1999 Pan American Games
Medalists at the 2007 Pan American Games
20th-century Canadian women
21st-century Canadian women
Medallists at the 2002 Commonwealth Games
Medallists at the 2010 Commonwealth Games